Zaveh Rural District is a rural district (dehestan) in the Central District of Zaveh County, Razavi Khorasan Province, Iran. At the 2006 census, its population was 17,423, in 4,287 families.  The rural district has 31 villages.

References 

Rural Districts of Razavi Khorasan Province
Zaveh County